Rainbow City can refer to:

 Rainbow City, Alabama
 Rainbow City, Arizona
 Rainbow City, Panama
 Rainbow City (TV series), shown on the BBC in 1967, it was the first British television series to star a black actor
 Rainbow City, an installation by FriendsWithYou, seen in Toronto, Miami, and New York City